Cavia is a genus in the subfamily Caviinae that contains the rodents commonly known as guinea pigs or cavies.  The best-known species in this genus is the domestic guinea pig, Cavia porcellus, a meat animal in South America and a common household pet outside of that continent.

Former taxonomic controversy
Cavia is classified in order Rodentia, although there was once a minority belief in the scientific community that evidence from mitochondrial DNA and proteins suggested the Hystricognathi might belong to a different evolutionary offshoot, and therefore a different order. If this had been so, it would have been an example of convergent evolution. However, this uncertainty is largely of historical interest, as abundant molecular genetic evidence now conclusively supports classification of Cavia as rodents. This evidence includes draft genome sequences of Cavia porcellus and several other rodents.

Species
Historically, there has been little consensus in regard to the number of Cavia forms and their taxonomic affiliations. Morphological characters differentiating between Cavia species are limited and levels of inter and intra specific morphologic variation have not been well documented, thus, interpretations have varied and resulted in very different taxonomic conclusions. Three scientists disagreed on the number of species, Tate(1935) recognized 11 species, while Cabrera(1961) recognized 7, and Huckinghaus(1961) recognized only 3. Recent scientific compilations have generally followed either Cabrera or Huckinghaus.

At least five wild species of guinea pig are recognised, in addition to the domestic form:

Cavia aperea – Brazilian guinea pig, widespread east of the Andes
Cavia fulgida – shiny guinea pig, eastern Brazil
Cavia intermedia – intermediate guinea pig, Moleques do Sul islands, Santa Catarina, Brazil, first described in 1999
Cavia magna – greater guinea pig, Uruguay, southeast Brazil
Cavia porcellus – domestic guinea pig, wild ancestor is likely:
Cavia tschudii – montane guinea pig, Peru south to northern Chile and northwest Argentina

Some authors also recognise the following additional species:
Cavia anolaimae (often considered a synonym of C. porcellus or a subspecies of C. aperea) – Colombia
Cavia guianae (often considered a synonym of C. porcellus or a subspecies of C. aperea) – Venezuela, Guyana, Brazil
Cavia patzelti  (often considered a synonym of C. aparea) - Ecuador

In addition, four fossil species have been identified:
†Cavia cabrerai - early Pliocene Argentina
†Cavia galileoi - late Pliocene Argentina
†Cavia lamingae - late Pleistocene Brazil
†Cavia vates - late Pleistocene Brazil

References

External links

Cavies
Rodents of South America
Mammals of the Andes
Pleistocene rodents
Quaternary mammals of South America
Middle Pleistocene
Extant Pleistocene first appearances
Rodent genera
Taxa named by Peter Simon Pallas